Missoula Hempfest is an annual cannabis event held in Missoula, Montana, in the United States. The fifth and tenth festivals were held in Caras Park in 2000 and 2005, respectively.

There was no Hempfest in 2020.

See also
 Cannabis in Montana
 Code of the West (2012 film)

References

1990s establishments in Montana
Cannabis events in the United States
Cannabis in Montana
Culture of Missoula, Montana
Festivals in Montana